Josh Winkler, better known as DJ Klever is an American turntablist and two-time US Disco Mix Club champion. He has toured the US and abroad, and currently resides in Atlanta, Georgia. Since early 2014 he has been rapper Yelawolf's touring DJ; he later started working with the rapper and signed to his record label Slumerican. He is involved in the rapper's second studio album Love Story, and has appeared in most of the singles' music videos.

Titles and awards 
 1999 Guitar Center South Eastern Regional 1st place Champion
 1999 Kool Mixx Atlanta 1st place Champion
 2000 Atlanta DMC Regional 1st place Champion
 2000 USA DMC 1st place Champion
 2001 USA DMC 1st place Champion
 2001 DMC World Champion 2nd place Runner up
 2001 ITF USA 1st place Champion (Advanced Categories)
 2001 Atlanta Kool Mixx 1st place Champion
 2002 USA Kool Mixx 1st place Champion
 2003 Atlanta Nike Battle Ground 1st place Champion
 2003 Rough Raleigh DJ Battle 1st place Champion
 2004 Breaklanta 1st place Champion

External links 

Living people
American hip hop DJs
Year of birth missing (living people)